Dato' Abdul Shukor bin Salleh  (born 4 December 1948) was a key midfield player for the Malaysia national football team during the 1970s. He was often called the "Mr.Cool" and "Malaysia Ardiles" of the Malaysian national team for the way he steered the Malaysian midfield with calm and composed way. He won the Malaysian National Sportsman Award in 1977 for his contribution to the national team. Furthermore, he was the second and the last football player after Mokhtar Dahari to be given that award. He was inducted into the FIFA Century Club in May 2021.

Career overview
Shukor Salleh was born in Tanjung Bungah, Penang in 1948. He received his early education at Tanjung Bungah Malay School, before going to Tanjung Tokong English School. He then completed his high school education at St. Xavier's Institution.

Shukor Salleh made his debut as a player with the Penang state team at the age of 18 in 1966. He went on to play for them until he was 37 in 1985.  

Shukor Salleh first played for the Malaysian national team in 1970 King's Cup. He also played for the national B team from 1971 until 1972. He went on to play a total of 215 matches for Malaysia (including non 'A' matches). 172 caps is against full national team. He is the second most capped Malaysian player, behind Soh Chin Aun.

He played for Malaysia at many international tournaments including four editions of the SEA Games, two Asian Games and two AFC Asian Cup.

On 11 May 1975, Shukor is part of the Malaysia Selection that played against Arsenal FC in a friendly match which his team won by 2-0 at Merdeka Stadium. 

He also was a key player in midfield to the Malaysian team that qualified to the 1980 Olympic games Moscow which Malaysia boycotted.
Malaysia won the play-off against South Korea with a 2–1 score in the Merdeka Stadium.

In 2002, He was awarded Maal Hijrah Sports Figure by Penang Malay Association.

On 17 September 2014, FourFourTwo list him on their list of the top 25 Malaysian footballers of all time.

Honours
Penang
 Burnley Cup: 1966
 Malaysia Kings Gold Cup: 1968, 1969
 Malaysia Cup: 1974
 Aga Khan Gold Cup: 1976
 Malaysia League: 1982

Malaysia
 Bronze medal Asian Games: 1974
 Gold Medal SEA Games: 1977, 1979
 King's Cup: 1972, 1977
 Merdeka Cup: 1973, 1974, 1976, 1979
 South Vietnam Independence Cup: 1971

Individual
 Malaysian National Sportsman Award: 1977
 Penang Men’s Athletes Award 1978/1979
 AFC Century Club Awards 1999
 Goal.com The best Malaysia XI of all time: 2020
IFFHS Men’s All Time Malaysia Dream Team: 2022

Orders

  Member of the Order of the Defender of the Realm (A.M.N.) (1978)
  Officer of the Order of the Defender of State (DSPN) – Dato’

See also
 List of men's footballers with 100 or more international caps

References

External links
28 MAC 2021 – BERITA PERDANA – NASIHAT LEGENDA SHUKOR SALLEH | Berita RTM  (In Malay)
 20,000 cheer Penang victory The Straits Times, 8 July 1968, Page 19 - National Library of Singapore

1948 births
Malaysian footballers
Malaysia international footballers
1976 AFC Asian Cup players
1980 AFC Asian Cup players
People from Penang
Penang F.C. players
Living people
Malaysian people of Malay descent
Asian Games bronze medalists for Malaysia
Asian Games medalists in football
Southeast Asian Games gold medalists for Malaysia
Southeast Asian Games medalists in football
Southeast Asian Games bronze medalists for Malaysia
Members of the Order of the Defender of the Realm
Association football midfielders
Footballers at the 1974 Asian Games
Medalists at the 1974 Asian Games
Competitors at the 1973 Southeast Asian Peninsular Games
FIFA Century Club